Lutterworth was a station which opened in 1899 to serve the Leicestershire market town of Lutterworth. It was situated on the Great Central Railway, the last main line to be constructed from the north of England to London. The station was equipped with an island platform designed by Alexander Ross which allowed the tracks to pass either side of a central platform, and was intended to facilitate future expansion of the railway.

The station closed along with the railway line in 1969, and today little remains of it. Along Station Road can be found the stationmaster's house and the cutting where the yards and station stood.

References 

Disused railway stations in Leicestershire
Former Great Central Railway stations
Railway stations in Great Britain opened in 1899
Railway stations in Great Britain closed in 1969
Beeching closures in England
Lutterworth